Hesar (also Romanized as Ḩeşār; also known as Ḩeşār-e Ardovey and Ḩeşār-e Ardovī) is a village in Zeberkhan Rural District, Zeberkhan District, Nishapur County, Razavi Khorasan Province, Iran. At the 2006 census, its population was 853, in 233 families.

References 

Populated places in Nishapur County